Andriy Viktorovych Lakeyenko (born 29 September 1999) is a Ukrainian professional footballer who plays as a defender for FC Chernihiv.

Player career

FC Chernihiv
In 2020, Lakeyenko started his career with FC Chernihiv in the Ukrainian Second League. On 6 September, he made his debut for his new team against Rubikon Kyiv in the 2020–21 Ukrainian Second League. On 18 August 2021 he played in the 2021–22 Ukrainian Cup against Chaika Petropavlivska Borshchahivka. On 27 August 2022 he made his debut in Ukrainian First League against Skoruk Tomakivka at the Yunist Stadium in Chernihiv.

Career statistics

Club

References

External links
 Andriy Lakeyenko at FC Chernigiv 
 
 

1999 births
Living people
Association football defenders
FC Chernihiv players
Ukrainian footballers
Ukrainian Second League players
Ukrainian First League players